Tikin Xic, pronounced "teekeen sheek" in Yucatec Mayan and meaning "dry fish", is a fish dish prepared in the Meso-American style.  The fish is prepared whole then marinated with adobo de achiote and sour oranges then wrapped in a banana leaf and cooked in an earth oven beneath a wood fire.

Preparation 

The dish is prepared with a firm white fish, usually grouper, drum, or a local variety from the same families (for example mero).

Modernization 

Modern cooking methods have simplified the preparation at the risk of changing it.  The banana leaf is usually steamed instead of buried for cooking.  In some cases the fish is prepared ahead of time and served with an achiote sauce.

References 

Mesoamerican cuisine